Oenothera deltoides is a species of evening primrose known by several common names, including birdcage evening primrose, basket evening primrose, lion in a cage, and devil's lantern. It is native to the Southwestern United States and northern Mexico, where it grows in sandy habitats from desert to beach.

The plant is grayish with basal, deltoid leaves. The large white flowers turn pinkish as they mature. When the plants die, the stems curl upward and form the "birdcage" for which the common name is derived.

There are five subspecies. One of these, the Antioch Dunes Evening Primrose (ssp. howellii), is a federally listed endangered species known from a few sandy spots in the Antioch Dunes National Wildlife Refuge just inland from the San Francisco Bay Area in California.

Oenothera caespitosa is very similar, but lacks stems and has slightly larger flowers.

References 

Roadside plants of Southern California. Thomas J. Belzer. Mountain Press Publishing Company, 1984.

External links
Calflora Database: Oenothera deltoides (Birdcage evening primrose,  Desert lantern, Dune primrose)
Jepson Manual eFlora (TJM2) treatment of Oenothera deltoides
UC Photos gallery − Oenothera deltoides

deltoides
Flora of California
Flora of Northwestern Mexico
Flora of the Great Basin
Flora of the Southwestern United States
Flora of the California desert regions
Flora of the Sonoran Deserts
Natural history of the Central Valley (California)
Natural history of the Colorado Desert
Natural history of the Mojave Desert
Night-blooming plants
Flora without expected TNC conservation status